Thalassococcus lentus is a Gram-negative and non-motile bacterium from the genus of Thalassococcus which has been isolated from seawater from a seaweed farm from the South Sea in Korea.

References

External links
Type strain of Thalassococcus lentus at BacDive -  the Bacterial Diversity Metadatabase

Rhodobacteraceae
Bacteria described in 2013